Black Athena: The Afroasiatic Roots of Classical Civilization, its three volumes first published in 1987, 1991, and 2006 respectively, is a controversial book by Martin Bernal proposing an alternative hypothesis on the origins of ancient Greece and classical civilisation. Bernal's thesis discusses the perception of ancient Greece in relation to Greece's African and Asiatic neighbors, especially the ancient Egyptians and Phoenicians who, he believes, colonized ancient Greece. Bernal proposes that a change in the Western perception of Greece took place from the 18th century onward and that this change fostered a subsequent denial by Western academia of any significant African and Phoenician influence on ancient Greek civilization.

Black Athena has been heavily criticised by academics. They often highlight the fact that there is no archaeological evidence for ancient Egyptian colonies in mainland Greece or the Aegean Islands. Academic reviews of Bernal's work generally reject his heavy reliance on ancient Greek mythology, speculative assertions, and handling of archaeological, linguistic, and historical data. The book has also been accused that, by reopening the nineteenth-century discourse on race and origins, it has become part of the problem of racism rather than the solution that its author had envisioned. Bernal himself has been accused of pursuing political motives and enlisting Bronze Age Greece in an academic war against Western civilisation.

Thesis

Origins of Ancient Greek civilization

Bernal rejects the theory that Greek civilization was founded by Indo-European settlers from Central Europe; that theory (which Bernal calls the Aryan model) became generally accepted during the 19th century. Bernal defends instead what he calls the Ancient model; the name refers to the fact that both Egyptian and Phoenician influences on the Greek world were widely accepted in Antiquity.

Bernal discusses Aeschylus's play The Suppliants, which describes the arrival in Argos from Egypt of the Danaids, daughters of Danaus. Cadmus was believed to have introduced the Phoenician alphabet to Greece. Herodotus also mentions Eastern influences. Thucydides did not, which Bernal explains with his nationalistic wish to set up a sharp distinction between Greeks and barbarians. Plutarch attacked Herodotus' view that the Greeks had learned from barbarians. Yet Alexander the Great was very interested in Egypt; Plutarch himself wrote a work On Isis and Osiris, part of the Moralia, which is a major source on Egypt. Admiration for Egypt was widespread in the Hellenistic and Roman civilizations, especially in the Neoplatonic school. Hermeticism was based on writings attributed to Egyptian Hermes Trismegistus, the so-called Hermetica or Hermetic corpus. These pro-Egyptian currents influenced Christianity, Judaism and Islam, as well as Renaissance figures such as Copernicus, Ficino and Giordano Bruno. It was demonstrated in 1614 that the Hermetic corpus was not very ancient at all and originated in late antiquity, though more recent scholarship has established that parts of it do probably have a Pharaonic origin. Casaubon's textual analysis partly discredited the Hermetic corpus, but Bernal maintained that respect for Ancient Egypt survived and contributed to the Enlightenment in the 18th century. The Freemasons are particularly relevant.

Bernal traces thus the influence from the Ancient Egyptians and Phoenicians to the Ancient Greeks, and a tradition of acknowledgement of those links from Antiquity to the Enlightenment.

Bernal uses linguistic evidence to support his claim of a link between Ancient Greece and earlier Egyptian and Phoenician civilizations. The Classical Greek language arose from the Proto-Greek language with influences from the Anatolian languages that were spoken nearby, and the culture is assumed to have developed from a comparable amalgamation of elements.

However, Bernal emphasizes African elements in Ancient Near Eastern culture and denounces the alleged Eurocentrism of 19th and 20th century research, including the very slogan "Ex Oriente Lux" of Orientalists which, according to Bernal, betrays "the Western appropriation of ancient Near Eastern culture for the sake of its own development" (p. 423).

Bernal proposes instead that Greek evolved from the contact between an Indo-European language and culturally influential Egyptian and Semitic languages. He believes that many Greek words have Egyptian or Semitic roots. Bernal places the introduction of the Greek alphabet (unattested before 750 BC) between 1800 and 1400 BC, and the poet Hesiod in the tenth century.

Ideologies of classical scholarship
The first volume of Black Athena describes in detail Bernal's views on how the Ancient model acknowledging Egyptian and Phoenician influences on Greece came under attack during the 18th and 19th centuries. Bernal concentrates on four interrelated forces: the Christian reaction, the idea of progress, racism and Romantic Hellenism.

The Christian reaction. Already Martin Luther had fought the Church of Rome with the Greek Testament. Greek was seen as a sacred Christian tongue which Protestants could plausibly claim was more Christian than Latin. Many French students of Ancient Greece in the 17th century were brought up as Huguenots. The study of Ancient Greece especially in Protestant countries created an alliance between Greece and Protestant Christianity which tended to exclude other influences.

The idea of progress. The antiquity of Egypt and Mesopotamia had previously made those civilizations particularly worthy of respect and admiration, but the emergence of the idea of progress portrayed later civilizations as more advanced and therefore better. Earlier cultures came to be seen as based on superstition and dogmatism.

Racism. The Atlantic slave trade and later European colonialism required the intellectual justification of racism. It became paramount to divorce Africans and Africa from high civilisation, and Egypt from Africa itself. Ancient Greeks would be divorced from Ancient Egypt through the concept of the Greek Miracle, and would be reclaimed as whites and Europeans.

Romanticism. Romantics saw humans as essentially divided in national or ethnic groups. The German philosopher Herder encouraged Germans to be proud of their origins, their language and their national characteristics or national genius. Romantics longed for small, virtuous and "pure" communities in remote and cold places: Switzerland, North Germany and Scotland. When considering the past, their natural choice was Greece. The Philhellenic movement led to new archaeological discoveries as well as contributed to the Greek War of Independence from the Ottoman empire. Most Philhellenes were Romantics and Protestants.

Reception 
The response to Bernal by classicists and archaeologists has been overwhermingly negative and critical. Linguists have faulted his linguistics, historians his history, and archeologists his tendency to ignore relevant archeological data. Egyptologists, too, reacted negatively to Bernal's book. As of 1999, over 100 negative reviews had been published about Black Athena, as well as two books refuting its assertions. According to Jacques Berlinerblau:

Ronald H. Fritze expands on Berlinerbau's statement, writing that:

According to Christina Riggs, Black Athena was embraced by Afrocentrists and postcolonial studies even as archaeology, Egyptology and classical scholarship rejected much of Bernal's evidence and, implicitly or explicitly, his central thesis.

There is no archaeological evidence that would clearly indicate a colonization which Bernal suggests. He himself says: “Here again, it should be made clear that, as with archaeological evidence, there are no smoking guns. There are no contemporary documents of the type 'X the Egyptian/Phoenician arrived at this place in Greece and established a city/kingdom (t)here', explicitly confirming the Ancient Model. Nor, for that matter, are there others denying it”. Bernal also devotes Black Athena to V. Gordon Childe and his book does fall into Childe's outdated paradigm of culture-historical archaeology. Michael Shanks criticized this outdated approach to archaeology stating:

In her review "The Use and Abuse of Black Athena" Professor of Classics Molly Myerowitz Levine states that:

Paul Oskar Kristeller, writing in the Journal of the History of Ideas, states that Bernal’s work is full of gross errors and that it has not received the criticism it deserves due to political reasons.

Scholars also criticized the fact that Bernal speaks of a unified Ancient Greek people and speaks of "Hellenic nationalism" and "national pride" in the 5th century BC which does not have any historical backing as the Greeks were not unified until the Hellenistic period and the tensions between different poleis was sometimes so great that it escalated into wars like the Peloponnesian War.

The book also ignited a debate in the academic community. While some reviewers contend that studies of the origin of Greek civilization were tainted by a foundation of 19th century racism, many have criticized Bernal for what they perceive to be the speculative nature of his hypothesis, unsystematic and linguistically incompetent handling of etymologies and a naive handling of ancient myth and historiography. The claims made in Black Athena were heavily questioned inter alia in Black Athena Revisited (1996), a collection of essays edited by Mary Lefkowitz and her colleague Guy MacLean Rogers.

Critics voice their strongest doubts over Bernal's approach to language and word derivations (etymologies). Cambridge Egyptologist John D. Ray has accused Bernal's work of having a confirmation bias. Edith Hall compares Bernal's thesis to the myth of the Olympian gods overwhelming the Titans and Giants, which was once thought of as a historical recollection of Homo sapiens taking over from Neanderthal man. She asserts that this historical approach to myth firmly belongs in the 19th century.

Others have challenged the lack of archaeological evidence for Bernal's thesis. Egyptologist James Weinstein points out that there is very little evidence that the ancient Egyptians were a colonizing people in the third millennium and second millennium BC. Furthermore, there is no evidence for Egyptian colonies of any sort in the Aegean world. Weinstein accuses Bernal of relying primarily on his interpretations of Greek myths as well as distorted interpretations of the archaeological and historical data.

Bernal has also been accused of pursuing political motives and enlisting Bronze Age Greece in an academic war against Western civilisation. Bernal in fact made no secret of his political motives and at the end of his introduction to Black Athena wrote that, “the political purpose of Black Athena is, of course, to lessen European cultural arrogance”. According to historian David Gress:

In 2001, Bernal published Black Athena Writes Back: Martin Bernal Responds to Critics as a response to criticism of his earlier works.

Although Bernal's hypotheses have been widely rejected, his work has still had a significant impact on classical scholarship and Egyptology. Some classicists have praised him for putting a spotlight on what they consider to be a Eurocentric bias in classical scholarship. Some Egyptologists have praised him for the fact that he studied ancient Greece in a wider cultural and geographical context, which they assert classicists tend not to do. Thomas McEvilley concluded in 2002 that while Bernal's "analysis of earlier periods of anti-Semitic attitude in regard to ancient Near Eastern culture may remain valuable, his attempt ... to derive Greek philosophy from Africa seems so glaringly unsupported by evidence that it is likely to pass without leaving a trace."

Classicist and linguist Jean-Fabrice Nardelli, in one of the very few reviews of Black Athena's third volume, writes that Bernal's "faith in his ability to pinpoint sound shifts in (P)IE matching, or stemming from, Afroasiatic and in the rightness of multilateral lexical comparisons à la Greenberg over the standard comparative method, looks misplaced; for he has not checked his facts and stands at the mercy of sources notorious for their quirks and errors. He notes that Bernal suffers from "proneness to blunders [which] further compromises his construct". Nardelli concludes that Bernal "applies no method but ad hoc reasoning based on contingency" and that "[t]he book is full of red herrings that betray its quality".

A number of archaeogenetic studies have since refuted Bernal's hypotheses of an Egyptian or Phoenician colonisation of Greece. In a 2017 study from Harvard University led by geneticist Iosif Lazaridis, the full genomes of 19 Bronze Age individuals, including Minoans from Crete and Mycenaeans from mainland Greece were extracted and analysed. With regards to Bernal's claims, the authors concluded that:

Editions of Black Athena

Volume 1
Black Athena: The Afroasiatic Roots of Classical Civilization Rutgers University Press (1987) )
Black Athena: Afro-Asiatic Roots of Classical Civilization: The Fabrication of Ancient Greece, 1785–1985 Vol. 1 (Paperback) Vintage; New Ed edition (21 Nov 1991)  
Black Athena: Afro-Asiatic Roots of Classical Civilization: The Fabrication of Ancient Greece, 1785–1985 Vol. 1 (Paperback) Free Association Books (29 Nov 2004)

Volume 2
Black Athena: Afro-Asiatic Roots of Classical Civilization: The Archaeological and Documentary Evidence Vol. 2 (Paperback) Publisher: Free Association Books (1 Jan 1991)  
Black Athena: the Afroasiatic Roots of Classical Civilization Vol. 2 (Hardcover) Rutgers University Press (Jul 1991)

Volume 3
Black Athena: The Afroasiatic Roots of Classical Civilization, Volume III: The Linguistic Evidence Vol. 3 (Hardcover) Rutgers University Press (25 Nov 2006)  
Black Athena: The Afroasiatic Roots of Classical Civilization, Volume III: The Linguistic Evidence Free Association Books (1 Feb 2006)

Books and articles about Black Athena
Black Athena 2: History without Rules. Robert L. Pounder The American Historical Review, Vol. 97, No. 2 (Apr., 1992), pp. 461–464 .
 Mary R. Lefkowitz,  Not Out of Africa: How Afrocentrism Became an Excuse to Teach Myth As History, 1997,  
 Mary R. Lefkowitz and Guy MacLean Rogers (eds.), Black Athena Revisited, 1996,  
 Mary R. Lefkowitz, History Lesson, 2008,  
 Martin Bernal, Black Athena Writes Back: Martin Bernal Responds to His Critics, 2001.
 Jacques Berlinerblau, Heresy in the University: The Black Athena Controversy and the Responsibilities of American Intellectuals, 1999,  
 Michael Skupin. "Anacalypsis II: A review of Black Athena Vol. I and II by Martin Bernal." Epigraphic Society Occasional Publications, Vol. 20 (1991), p. 28–29.
 Duncan Hallas, Absent Friends, Socialist Worker Review, 100 (1987)
1987 Black Athena The Afroasiatic Roots of Classical Civilization 1: The Fabrication of Ancient Greece 1785–1985. London: Free Association Books. and New Brunswick: Rutgers University.
"Black Athena and the APA." in "The Challenge of Black Athena" Special issue of Arethusa. pp. 17–37.
1990 "Responses to Critical Reviews of Black Athena: Volume I: in the Journal of Mediterranean Archaeology 3/1:111- 137.
1991 Black Athena 2: The Archaeological and Documentary Evidence. London, Free Association Books; New Brunswick: Rutgers University.
1993 "Response", to "Dialogue: Martin Bernal's Black Athena." Journal of Women's History 4.3, (Winter):119–135.
1997 "Responses to Black Athena." Black Athena: Ten Years After. Special edition of Talanta vols. 28 and 29. pp. 65–99, 165–173 and 209–219.

See also
Pre-Greek substrate
Life of Sethos

References

External links
Black Athena website
Bernal reviews Lefkowitz's "Not out of Africa"
Lefkowitz on Bernal on Lefkowitz, Not Out of Africa
	The Case against Martin Bernal by David Gress
Josine H. Blok, "Proof and Persuasion in Black Athena: The Case of K. O. Müller", in: Journal of the History of Ideas 57.4 (1996) 705–724; a critical look at Bernal's historiography.
Ancient Histories and Modern Humanities by John R. Lenz (Drew University)
The Black Athena Debate from The World Ages Archive, a web-based reference for the study of ancient chronological revisionist, catastrophist, and the Afrocentric discourse.

1987 non-fiction books
20th-century history books
Afrocentrism
American Book Award-winning works
American non-fiction books
English-language books
History books about ancient Greece
Rutgers University Press books